Litorimonas haliclonae is a Gram-negative, rod-shaped and motile bacterium from the genus of Litorimonas which has been isolated from the sponge Haliclona.

References 

Rhodobacterales
Bacteria described in 2018